Nivea Smith (born 18 February 1990) is a sprinter who specializes in the 200 metres. She grew up in Freeport where she attended Mary Star of the Sea Primary School, and later graduated from Grand Bahama Catholic High School. She later went on to compete for Auburn University where she was coached by Henry Rolle. She became the first Bahamian to ever medal at the IAAF World Youth Championships when she earned a bronze in the 200m in 2007 with a time of 23.69.

Personal bests

Achievements

References

External links
 World Athletics Bio
 Auburn Bio
 Smith 2006 Carifta Games 200m Gold
 Nivea Smith post race interview after her 200m in Moscow

1990 births
Living people
Bahamian female sprinters
Athletes (track and field) at the 2014 Commonwealth Games
Commonwealth Games competitors for the Bahamas
People from Freeport, Bahamas
Auburn Tigers women's track and field athletes
Auburn University alumni